Abhagin (Ill-Fated Woman) is a 1938 Hindi film directed by Prafulla Roy for New Theatres Ltd., Calcutta. A bilingual, it was made in Bengali language as Abhigyan. The film was based on a story by Upendranath Ganguly, with dialogues by A. H. Shore. R. C. Boral provided the music composition with lyrics for the Hindi version by Munshi Arzu (Arzu Lucknawi), and by Ajoy Bhattacharya for the Bengali. The screenplay was by Phani Majumdar for whom it was his first independent film as a scriptwriter. Bimal Roy, who was to make a name for himself as a prominent Bengali and Hindi director, was the cinematographer for the film. The cast included Molina Devi, Prithviraj Kapoor, Vijay Kumar, Nemo and Bikram Kapoor.

A wife rejected by her in-laws following her abduction is given shelter by the husband's friend. The story line follows the wife's ambivalent feelings for her saviour when she's accepted back into the family.

Plot
Sandhya (Molina Devi), married to Priyalal (Vijay Kumar), lives with him at his father's (Nemo) residence. The father, Jawaharlal Choudhary, is an over-bearing ruthless landlord. When he throws one of the tenants out for not paying the rent, the tenant violently attacks Choudhary, hurting his son who comes to his defense. The tenant then kidnaps Sandhya, but she manages to escape. She initially finds shelter with a relative (Bikram Kapoor) of hers. When she reaches home, her father-in-law refuses to let her stay as she's spent time away from home in company of a man. Though her husband sides her, he's unwilling to confront his father. Sandhya is then given shelter by a friend of her husband, Promod (Prithviraj Kapoor). Promod helps Sandhya find her way in life. A bond is formed between the two. The in-laws are cleared of their misunderstanding and urge Sandhya to return home. Torn between her feelings for Promod and tradition, she chooses tradition and returns to her husband.

Cast

Hindi
 Prithviraj Kapoor as Promod
 Molina Devi as Sandhya
 Vijay Kumar as Priyalal
 Nemo as Jawaharlal Chowdhary, Priyala’s father
 Bikram Kapoor as Prakash
 Devbala
 Menaka Devi as Nazma
 Pankaj Mullick
 Rajlakshmi
 Chaman Puri

Bengali
  
 Molina Devi as Sandhya
 Jiban Ganguly as Pramatha
 Sailen Pal as Priyalal
 Sailen Choudhury as Prakash
 Bhanu Bannerjee as Suresh
 Manoranjan Bhattacharya as Jawaharlal Chowdhary
 Devbala as Sabita
 Manorama as Manada Mashi
 Pankaj Mullick as Club member
 Menaka Devi as Nazma

Review
Baburao Patel, editor of the cine-magazine Filmindia found the story "rather far-fetched", claiming that it "stretches the imagination unsympathetically". Photography by Bimal Roy was commended with the "outdoors …more satisfactory than the indoor work". According to Patel, several scenes were undeveloped with a weak direction being responsible for it. The performance of Prithviraj Kapoor was commended "Once again Prithviraj is easily the best, because he gives a natural performance. Mollina also gives a sympathetic portrayal, but she has not been directed well". Vijay Kumar's performance as Priyalal was found to be weak and uninteresting.

The film did not do well at the box office as reported by Filmindia: "Abhagin did not fair (sic) well at 
the Minerva Talkies in Bombay. It is a pity that New Theatres should have given a weak picture for the box offices".

Soundtrack
The music direction was by R. C. Boral and the singers were Molina Devi, Vijay Kumar, Kamla Jharia and Akbar Khan Peshawri.

Song List

References

External links
 
 

1938 films
1930s Hindi-language films
Indian black-and-white films
Bengali-language Indian films
1930s Bengali-language films
Films scored by Pankaj Mullick